Harry James Cardwell (born 28 October 1996) is a professional footballer who plays as a centre-forward and winger for National League side Southend United. 

He is considered strong, skilful and with a good turn of pace and excellent movement in leading the line. At the age of 10, Cardwell started his career with Hull City's youth system. He was then snapped up at 16-years of age for a £75K fee by Reading in 2013, joining as part of their academy setup. Two one-month loan spells at National League sides Woking in 2015 and Braintree Town in 2016. After being released by Reading, Cardwell went on trial with League Two side Grimsby Town and signed a contract in July 2017. He is a former Scotland U21 international.

Club career
Cardwell was born in Beverley, East Riding of Yorkshire and raised in the village of North Cave. He attended South Hunsley School in Melton, East Riding of Yorkshire and started his career with Hull City where he spent seven years in their youth system.

Reading
Cardwell signed for Reading in July 2013, joining their academy, a compensation fee of £75,000 agreed under the Elite Player Performance Plan (EPPP). Having finished joint top scorer for the under-18s, Cardwell signed professional terms with Reading in July 2014. In January 2017, he went on loan to Championship rivals Brighton & Hove Albion in their under-23s until the end of the season.

On 10 September 2015, Cardwell joined National League side Woking on a one-month youth loan deal, to strengthen their options up front after a serious injury to Scott Rendell.

Cardwell joined National League side Braintree Town in March 2016 on a one-month loan.

Grimsby Town
Cardwell joined up with League Two side Grimsby Town on 4 July 2017, to try and earn himself a contract. Having impressed in his trial, scoring four goals in pre season, Cardwell signed a two-year contract with the club on 17 July 2017 on a free transfer.

Cardwell made his professional debut with Grimsby on 5 August 2017; coming off the subs bench on 79 minutes in their 3–1 victory at Chesterfield, he latched on to a through ball by Luke Summerfield, but Cardwell was brought down as he was about to shoot for goal, winning his team an 85th minute penalty, which was put away by Ben Davies to finish Chesterfield off. He scored his first goal for Grimsby in an EFL Trophy tie against Doncaster Rovers on 29 August 2017.

Chorley
Following his release by Grimsby in June 2020, Cardwell joined National League North side, Chorley on a permanent deal, following his earlier loan spell. In December 2020, Cardwell scored his first league goal following his permanent move, a 25 yard strike in a 1-0 win against Guiseley at Victory Park. Cardwell played his role in the club's impressive FA Cup run as they reached the Fourth Round before being beaten 1–0 by Premier League side Wolverhampton Wanderers. He featured in all six matches in Chorley's run scoring twice, against Gateshead in a 2–1 Second Qualifying Round victory and in a 3–2 comeback victory at League One Wigan Athletic.

On 22 February 2021, Cardwell joined National League side Stockport County on loan for the remainder of the 2020-21 season, following the early conclusion to the National League North season. He scored his first goals for the club in his third appearance  with the third in a 5–0 thrashing of Solihull Moors.

Southend United
On 20 January 2022, Cardwell joined National League side Southend United

Cardwell scored his first goal for the club - in only his second appearance - in a game against Aldershot Town.

International career
Cardwell is eligible to play for Scotland because two of his grandparents are from Midlothian.

He made his debut for the Scotland U19 team on 24 May 2014, coming off the bench in a 0–0 draw against Ukraine U21 at the Pirelli Stadium in England. He came of the bench and scored two goals in a 2–2 draw against Czech Republic U19 at Cappielow Park. He made ten appearances for Scotland under-19 between May 2014 and March 2015. Cardwell was called up on 5 November 2014 to the Scotland U21 side. He made his debut for the U21 team in a 1–1 draw against Switzerland U21 in Switzerland.

Style of play
A Powerhouse centre forward, strong, skilful and with a good turn of pace and excellent movement in leading the line.

Personal life
Cardwell's grandfather Tom Wilson was a Scottish centre back, he played for Millwall and Hull City.

Career statistics

References

External links
Harry Cardwell profile at the Grimsby Town F.C. website

1996 births
Living people
Sportspeople from Beverley
English footballers
Scottish footballers
Scotland youth international footballers
Scotland under-21 international footballers
Association football forwards
Hull City A.F.C. players
Reading F.C. players
Grimsby Town F.C. players
Woking F.C. players
Braintree Town F.C. players
Chorley F.C. players
Stockport County F.C. players
Southend United F.C. players
Brighton & Hove Albion F.C. players
English Football League players
National League (English football) players
English people of Scottish descent